"Sharpe's Skirmish" is a historical short story by Bernard Cornwell in the Richard Sharpe series.

"Sharpe's Skirmish" was first written in 1998. British bookseller W. H. Smith devised the idea of giving away a Sharpe short story with every copy of Sharpe's Fortress. This irritated other publishers, and only a few thousand copies were printed. Much later, Cornwell revised the story, which was published by the Sharpe Appreciation Society.

Plot
This short story occurs after Sharpe's Sword in the summer of 1812. Sharpe and his men escort commissary Major Tubbs to an abandoned Spanish fort where a cache of thousands of muskets has been forgotten in the general French retreat in northern Spain. Unbeknownst to the British, French Major Ducos has authorised a surprise raid to threaten the Duke of Wellington's supply lines and hopefully delay the British pursuit long enough for the French to regroup. To accomplish this, the French first need to secure the fort, which guards a bridge across the Tormes River. However, Sharpe stands in the way, and for the first (but by no means last) time thwarts a scheme involving Ducos.

Characters in "Sharpe's Skirmish"

Captain Richard Sharpe – rifle captain in the British army, commanding the Light Company of the South Essex Regiment
Teresa Moreno – Sharpe's wife, a Spanish partisan
Sergeant Patrick Harper – Sharpe's right-hand man and friend
Major Michael Hogan – an engineer and Wellington's head of intelligence 
Lieutenant-General Sir Arthur Wellesley – commander of the British army in Spain

Allusions to actual history, geography and current science

References are made to incidents during the Peninsular War and the Siege of Gawilghur. Lieutenant General Wellington was based on the real historical figure of the same name with limited dramatic licence taken.

Publication history
1999, UK, HarperCollins Pub date 1 March 1999, Limited Edition Paperback
2002, UK, Sharpe Appreciation Society , Pub date 2 September 2002, Revised Extended Paperback Edition

References

External links
 Section from Bernard Cornwell's website on Sharpe's Skirmish
 Sharpe Appreciation Society
 Read on-line

1999 short stories
Skirmish
Historical short stories
Short stories by Bernard Cornwell
HarperCollins books